Carleton "Carty" S. Finkbeiner (born May 30, 1939) is an American Democratic politician and former mayor of Toledo, Ohio. First elected in 1993, he took office on January 1, 1994.  In 1997, he defeated challenger Nick Wichowski to win a second term. Term limits prevented him from running a third consecutive time. He was succeeded by former mayor Jack Ford in 2002. Following his first administration, Finkbeiner served on the Toledo-Lucas County Port Authority board.  He joined the ABC affiliate in Toledo and hosted Carty & Company, a Sunday morning public affairs show. He also contributed a weekly editorial segment, It's Just Not Right!  Finkbeiner left WTVG in May 2005.

On June 30, 2005, Finkbeiner announced that he would seek a third term as mayor. He won the Toledo mayoral primary, winning roughly 37% of the vote in comparison to 29% earned by incumbent Ford. On November 8, 2005, Finkbeiner was re-elected mayor. Finkbeiner was sworn in for his third term as mayor in a private ceremony on January 3, 2006. Carty announced that his third run as mayor would be his final one and he would not seek re-election. According to city finance records verified by the Toledo Blade, Finkbeiner left the city with a 48 million dollar deficit which was inherited by Ohio Fire Marshall Michael P. Bell, an Independent, who succeeded Carty Finkbeiner in 2010.

Finkbeiner resides with his wife, Amy Finkbeiner, in South Toledo.  He has three children: Ryan, Jenny, and Katie, and five grandchildren.

Finkbeiner announced plans to run for a fourth term as mayor of Toledo on August 29, 2015.  The 2015 election, to fill the remainder of Michael Collins' mayoral term, was won by Paula Hicks-Hudson.

In July 2021, Finkbeiner filed a petition to run again for mayor of Toledo, challenging incumbent Wade Kapszukiewicz.

Background
Finkbeiner was born in 1939 and raised in Toledo. He graduated from Maumee Valley Country Day School and received a B.A. from Denison University in Granville, Ohio. Prior to his political career, he taught at Maumee Valley Country Day School, St. Francis de Sales High School, and the University of Toledo.

During his long career in public service, Carty has been a member of multiple parties. At various times and for various offices he has run as a Republican, a Democrat and an Independent.  Finkbeiner served eight years as a city councilman and two years as deputy mayor.

Controversy 
Several controversies have occurred during Finkbeiner's involvement in public office:
 In November 1994, Mayor Carty Finkbeiner suggested at a staff meeting that a way to resolve complaints about airport noise would be to move deaf people into the neighborhood.
 Toledo restaurateur John Skiadas filed a lawsuit alleging that Finkbeiner physically and verbally assaulted him at the Erie Street Market in 2000. The lawsuit was dismissed by Lucas County Common Pleas Judge Charles Wittenberg in 2004.
In March, 1999, Finkbeiner called for a boycott of Little Caesar's Pizza because of the franchise owners’ involvement in a proposed Rossford sports arena. Some Little Caesar's stores renamed their Crazy Bread "Carty Bread".
In 1997, the Finkbeiner Administration negotiated to convert the Beacon Place Apartments, an apartment complex in the Warren-Sherman neighborhood near downtown Toledo, into condominiums. Despite assurances from Finkbeiner's housing commissioner, James Thurston, that the city would not be held financially responsible for the project, the project collapsed because the Finkbeiner Administration failed to clear the sale of the properties with the federal government, which had financed the apartments. Toledo taxpayers lost $230,000 and could have paid more than $2.3 million. Thurston and Edwin Bergsmark (CEO of Cavista Corporation, the owner of the Beacon Place Apartments) were both convicted in this scandal.
 He plagiarized a single line in his KICK-OFF speech in 1998.
 In early 2006, political adversaries scoffed over the mayor spending $9,996 of city money to complete the installation of shower facilities in his city government building office. The project was considered "controversial" in part because the shower quote was originally $10,006, six dollars over a threshold that requires approval from City Council. The contractor was able to shave $10 from the project, thus avoiding a Council vote on the proposal.
 In May 2006, he called Toledo's African American Fire Chief Michael Bell "King Kong" at a staff meeting. Finkbeiner later clarified his remarks as relating to the Chief's physical stature, and Chief Bell has acknowledged in public that he took no offense to the remarks.
 In June 2006, Jack Smith resigned from his brief tenure as Chief of Police after what he described as a near-physical confrontation with the mayor after they exchanged words.
 In February 2008, Finkbeiner refused to let a company of 200 Marine Corps Reservists engage in urban patrol exercises on the streets of downtown as well as inside the mostly vacant Madison Building, 607 Madison Ave.  Toledo police knew about the event three days in advance, but it wasn't until the Marines arrived that "the mayor asked them to leave because they frighten people", said Brian Schwartz, the mayor's spokesman. Finkbeiner defended his decision to cancel the exercise, but in an e-mail to Marine Corps officials, he expressed support for the Marines and the military and invited the Marine unit to return to Toledo for training, but not downtown. In reaction to the uproar, Finkbeiner has offered conflicting explanations for his denial. During a radio interview on The Frank Beckmann Show on WJR-760 AM in Detroit on Tuesday, Feb. 12th, Finkbeiner used profanity to describe the situation he caused as a "fucking ruckus".
In summer 2008, Finkbeiner spent nearly $80,000 of taxpayer money (without City Council approval) to renovate Bay 4 the Erie Street Market into a concert venue. According to the City Charter, the mayor may spend up to $10,000 without City Council approval. Finkbeiner broke the nearly $80,000 into 13 separate contracts under $10,000 to circumvent council's approval. Moreover, Finkbeiner tapped a local concert promoter, Rob Croak, to schedule events at the Erie Street Market. Croak was convicted on one count of forgery and has been arrested for but not convicted of underage alcohol sales, according to court records. The forgery conviction stems from a 2001 accusation that Croak falsified records to obtain a liquor permit. Also, Croak owes thousands of dollars in back state and federal taxes.
 In 2009, Take Back Toledo (a group of Toledo area businessmen whose goal is to foster a pro-business, pro-jobs and pro-economic development climate in Northwestern Ohio) led a campaign to recall Finkbeiner from office. On April 15, the Lucas County Board of Elections validated 20,400 signature, enough to recall Finkbeiner. On April 20, Clerk of Council Jerry Dendinger hand-delivered a recall notice to Finkbeiner. According to the City Charter, Finkbeiner had five days to resign or face a recall vote on the November election. Finkbeiner refused to resign and hired a law firm to contest the validity of the recall petition signatures. The Supreme Court of Ohio ultimately ruled that due to missing language in the recall petition, that it was invalid.
 In June 2009, Finkbeiner supported the $25 parking tickets issued by the Division of Streets, Bridges, and Harbor to residents for parking in their own driveways.  He claimed the tickets were given due to a city law that prohibits parking on unpaved surfaces, which includes gravel driveways.  Two major problems with the tickets were that the city law that had not been enforced for about 50 years was now suddenly being enforced without warning and that according to the Toledo City Charter only the Toledo Police Dept can issue tickets for parking, traffic, etc. and not representatives of other city agencies. Despite criticism, Finkbeiner ignored a press question asking if the fines were related to the city's financial woes.
In June 2009, a video surfaced showing Finkbeiner breaking up a fight in Highland Park, calling one boy "fatso", "tubby", and "fat ass".

References

1939 births
Living people
Ohio city council members
Mayors of Toledo, Ohio
Ohio Democrats
Candidates in the 2021 United States elections
Denison University alumni
Maumee Valley Country Day School alumni